South Barito Regency is a regency in Central Kalimantan province of Indonesia. The regency seat is located in town of Buntok, located in South Dusun district. The population of South Barito Regency was 124,128 at the 2010 Census and 131,100 at the 2020 Census; the official estimate as at mid 2021 was 131,606.

History 
It was part of Sultanate of Banjar, but ceded to Dutch East Indies in 1849. The region was previously known as Dusun Ilir. Later, the region became part of Kewedanan Barito Hilir, which the new Indonesian government inherited after independence. Later together with Kewedanan of East Barito, it was merged into single Barito Regency under newly formed Central Kalimantan province with capital in Muara Teweh. However, it was split again into several regencies in January 1959, becoming East Barito, South Barito, and North Barito.

Geography 
Land formation in the regency is considered old and relatively not considered fertile. Soil mostly consist of alluvium sediments from rivers and peat in swamp regions, with little to no volcanic material. Alluvium sediments were found along the banks of Barito river, making around 41.5% of soil formation in the regency, while further from the river other soil type such as regosol could be found.

Regency's topography is flat and low-lying but on the most part except on northern parts where mountain ranges could be found. The regency's low-lying regions are wetlands and swamps with little variations.

Economy 
The regency's economy is dominated by agriculture and fishery which consist of 19.34% of its gross regional product as of 2020. Second largest sector is mining with 13.43%, followed by transportation and logistic service with 12.24%, and trade sector with 8.52%. Mining is rapidly declining with decrease of 15.55% in 2020, while the fastest growing sector is social service and communication with increase of 21.37% and 17.69% respectively. Economic growth was 5.32% in 2019, but plummeted to -7.36% in 2020 due to the outbreak of COVID-19 pandemic in Indonesia. Due to growing reliance on service and restaurant sector especially in town of Buntok, the region has been hard hit by pandemic and restrictions it follows. However, the recent increase of information and communication sector according to Statistics Indonesia was credited to the pandemic. There are 42 active cooperation in the regency, 16 registered hotels, and 52 registered restaurants. The regency was visited by total 15,561 tourists in 2020, most of whom were domestic tourists. Majority of hotels and restaurants are located in town of Buntok.

The regency has relatively big output on fishery despite being located inland, especially from aquaculture. In 2020, in total it produces 8,766 tons of freshwater fish from aquaculture. On the same year, fish catches figure were 6,657 tons of freshwater fish. According to Statistics Indonesia, in 2020, livestock population in the regency is dominated by pigs with figure of 14,259 followed by water buffalo with 9,794.

Agriculture output in the regency in 2020 includes 13,044 tons of harvested paddy from ricefield, 87.1 tons of chili, 37.7 tons of tomato, 65.3 tons of long beans, 27.7 tons of water spinach, 29.1 tons of spinach, and 67.8 tons of cucumber. In addition, the regency produces 32.5 tons of melons, 214 tons of watermelons, and 73.1 tons of eggplants. Poverty rate was 6.12%.

Demographics 
The regency has population of 131,100 based on 2020 Census. Unlike regions around it, it has low population growth with figure of 0.53% in 2020. Life expectancy was 67 years which is lower than national average, and literacy rate was 99.75%. Sex ratio on the regency was 105, which means there are on average 105 men per 100 female population. This varies based on the district from Jenamas District with 101 sex ratio to North Dusun District with 107. As with most of regions in Indonesia, the population is dominated by youth on reproductive age above 15 years, consist of 66,812 people out of 131,100 in the regency.

Majority of population in the regency are Muslims with figure of 98,801 people, followed by significant minority of Protestant with 26,249, Catholic with 9,725, Hindu 4,986, and Buddhist with 2 people.

Climate 
Buntok has a tropical rainforest climate (Af) with heavy rainfall year-round. Temperature is relatively warm during the day up to 34 Celsius and could be as low as 20 Celsius at night. Rainfall yearly average is recorded on 325.6 milliliters and wind speed on 4.3 knots. June is the wettest month with recorder average of 720.9 milliliters of rainfall while the driest month is in August with just 81.9 milliliters.

Governance

Administrative districts 
South Barito Regency consists of six districts (kecamatan), tabulated below with their areas and their population totals from the 2010 Census and the 2020 Census, together with the official estimates as at mid 2021. The 2020 figures are rounded to the nearest 100 persons. The table also includes the locations of the district administrative centres, the number of administrative villages (rural desa and urban kelurahan) in each district, and its postal codes.

Local government 

It is a second-level administrative division equivalent to a city. As a regency, it is headed by a regent who is elected democratically. Head of districts are appointed directly by the regent with the recommendation of the regency secretary. Executive power lies with the regent and vice regent while legislative function is exercised by the regency's parliament.

Politics 
The regency is part of 4th Central Kalimantan electoral district, together with North Barito, Murung Raya, and East Barito Regency which together have 9 out of 45 representatives in provincial parliament. On regency level, it is divided into three electoral districts. Regency parliament has in total 25 representatives that are elected by the people of the regency in an election. Last election was in 2019 and the next one would be in 2024.

Infrastructure

Education 
In 2020, there are 108 kindergartens, 184 elementary schools, 79 junior high schools, 34 senior high schools, in addition to five vocational high schools. In addition, there are two higher education institutions in the regency, both of them located in South Dusun district. All of higher education institutions in the regency are private as of 2020. One of them is Dahani Dahanai Economy College, which offers bachelor in management. The other one is Al Ma'arif Islamic College which focus on Islam-related subjects.

Town of Buntok also has one public library owned by the regency government. In 2016, government of the regency stated that it would construct 10 smaller libraries in 10 villages.

Healthcare 
On healthcare, there is one hospital located in town of Buntok, two polyclinics, 64 puskesmas, and six registered pharmacies in the regency. Jaraga Sasameh Regional Hospital, the only hospital in the regency, is public owned by the regency government. The hospital is classified as C-class by Ministry of Health. Other than that, there are three registered medical clinics, 161 healthcare centers, 143 family planning clinics, and two maternity hospitals.

Transportation 

There are total 1,139.79 kilometers of road in the regency, majority of which is maintained by the regency government. 328.73 kilometers have been paved with asphalt, with the rest being either concrete, gravel, or other surfaces. Despite being located inland, the regency have passenger ports utilizing Barito River such as in Buntok and Jelapat. The regency is served by Sanggu Airport, located in town of Buntok, with regular flights to major cities in Kalimantan such as Palangka Raya and Banjarmasin. The airport was planned to be expanded to accommodate bigger planes in 2020.

The regency is connected to main cities in Kalimantan such as Banjarmasin and Balikpapan with bus, mainly served by Perum DAMRI.

Others 
Each district has one garbage dump facility except South Dusun district, which has nine. There are exactly 348 mosques, 137 Protestant churches, 30 Catholic churches, and one Hindu temple. In 2020, there are 57 registered market center facilities in the regency.

The regency has several parks concentrated mostly on town of Buntok, such as Iring Witu Park which has become center of street foods in the town. The regency government has taken initiative to make the park center of culinary tourism in the regency. Other park in the town, Rusa Park (literally means "Deer Park), has deer population roaming around and visitors often feed the deer. Other than that, the park also hosts a landmark of the town, a deer statue in the middle of the park. It also has playground for children and a Wi-Fi hotspot. Regency government also has plan to convert ex-dump facility into another park on early 2021.

The regency also has a stadium located in town of Buntok, named Batuah Stadium.

References

Notes 

Regencies of Central Kalimantan